Unni Birkrem is a Norwegian handball goalkeeper. She played 31 matches for the national handball team from 1985 to 1989, and participated at the 1986 World Women's Handball Championship, where the Norwegian team won a bronze medal. She is a sister of Åse Birkrem.

References

Year of birth missing (living people)
Living people
Norwegian female handball players